was a Korea-born, Japan-raised writer. He is considered the "founding father" of Resident Korean literature. He was born in Masanhoewon-gu. Although he spent most of his life in Japan, many of his literary works are set in Korea and explore the injustices of colonial rule and its painful aftermath.

See also 
 Korea under Japanese rule
 Koreans in Japan
 Yi Sang

References

1919 births
1997 deaths
Korean writers
Literature of Korea under Japanese rule
Korean emigrants to Japan